Sir Michael Alan Penning (born 28 September 1957) is a British Conservative Party politician, who has served as the Member of Parliament (MP) for Hemel Hempstead since 2005.

Penning was the Minister of State for the Armed Forces from 2016 to 2017, having previously served as the Minister of State for Justice and Minister of State for Policing from 2014 to 2016, the Minister for Disabled People from 2013 to 2014, the Minister of State for Northern Ireland from 2012 to 2013, and the Minister of State for Transport from 2010 to 2012.

He remains in the House of Commons as a backbencher.

Early life and career
Penning was born in Finchley, North London, and raised in the neighbouring county of Essex. He went to Appleton School, South Benfleet, before attending King Edmund School in Rochford. He enlisted in the British Army as a Grenadier Guardsman after leaving school, and served several tours in Northern Ireland, Kenya and Germany. During his time in the Grenadiers, an officer, Captain Robert Nairac, GC, was abducted and murdered by the IRA.

After leaving the Army, Penning subsequently worked as a firefighter for Essex County Fire and Rescue Service, before joining his family business and then becoming a political journalist. He is a supporter of Tottenham Hotspur F.C.

Political career
In the mid-1990s, Penning worked as a media adviser to the Euro-rebels who had had the Conservative Party whip removed by Prime Minister John Major during the Maastricht rebellion. He was subsequently the election agent to Sir Teddy Taylor during the 1997 general election. He stood for election in Thurrock at the 2001 general election, coming second to Labour's Andrew MacKinlay. Following this, he was appointed as a chief adviser to William Hague as Leader of the Opposition, later becoming the Conservative Party's Deputy Head of Media under the brief and unpopular leadership of Iain Duncan Smith.

Member of Parliament
At the 2005 general election Penning stood in the Labour-held seat of Hemel Hempstead, narrowly defeating sitting MP Tony McWalter. Penning overturned McWalter's 2001 majority of 3,742 votes and won the seat (after a partial recount) by 499 votes. In July 2007, Penning was promoted by Conservative Leader David Cameron to the post of Shadow Minister for Public Health.

The Buncefield fire occurred on 11 December 2005 and led to some 2,700 claims for compensation. In the words of neighbouring MP Peter Lilley, "There is something providential about the fact that the worst fire in western Europe since the Second World War should occur in a constituency represented by a fireman. It was undoubtedly in the interests of all his constituents and mine to have someone so knowledgeable, as well as so vigorous in their response, to represent their interests." Penning, who arrived on the scene within half an hour of the explosion, had himself been trained to deal with much smaller petroleum fires; the scenario was that one tank not twenty was affected.

Dexion workers, 700 of whom worked in the constituency, lost their pensions when the company went into receivership in 2003. Dexion played a prominent part in Ros Altmann's Pensions theft campaign. Penning, whose support for Dexion preceded his election, offered compensation from unclaimed assets in his 2005 Manifesto and has spoken on the issue 26 times in Parliament. Dexion pensioners were featured celebrating a victory at the High Court in February 2007 which eventually led to increased compensation from the then-Labour government.

According to Theyworkforyou.com, Penning spoke in an "above average" number of debates from 2009 to 2010 and replied to a "very high number" of messages. He also received replies to an "above average" number of written questions. The quality of those questions was disputed by a 2006 Times article about the Theyworkforyou website which Penning used to email constituents. His 624 questions in 10 months included one on sales of lost property in Royal Parks since records began. The newspaper suggested the objective was to increase ratings on the website, an allegation rejected by Penning.

Penning "occasionally rebelled", with two percent of his votes being against the Whip, and was "very strongly" in favour of a smoking ban. Penning's parliamentary expenses details have been published as part of a general publication of all MPs' expenses. In 2009, he claimed a total of £135,078, 502nd of all MPs. The Legg Report found no problem with his expenses. Penning did, however, voluntarily repay £2.99 for a dog bowl, which was the lowest recorded repayment by any MP.

Subsequent elections
Penning achieved one of the largest increases in his majority of all MPs at the 2010 general election, when he took 50% of the vote share to hold the seat with a majority of 13,406. This result relegated Labour's Ayfer Orhan to third place behind the Liberal Democrat candidate Richard Grayson, representing the largest swing from the Labour Party to the Conservative Party (a 14.4% swing) in the country.

In the 2015 general election, Penning increased his majority by 2.9% to 52.9% to hold his seat with a 14,420 majority. In the subsequent reshuffle, Penning was appointed as Minister of State in the Home Office for Policing and Criminal Justice. In the June 2017 general election he held Hemel Hempstead with a reduced majority of 9,445, but with an increased share of the vote (55%). He was re-elected in the 2019 general election.

On 17 May 2022, he announced that he would stand down at the next general election.

Minister of State

After the 2010 election, Prime Minister David Cameron appointed him a Minister of State for Transport, with roads and shipping being among his responsibilities. In his role as Road Safety Minister, he suggested that the Dutch could learn about cyclist safety from the British. However, cycling ambassador Roelof Wittink said that although the UK had a lower death toll per head of population, the Dutch use cycles far more and have one third of the fatalities per mile cycled.

In the reshuffle of 4 September 2012, Penning was moved to become Minister of State for Northern Ireland, a position he held for just over a year until being promoted to become Minister of State for Disabled People on 7 October 2013. He was subsequently promoted a second time on 15 July 2014 to serve as both the Minister of State for Policing and the Minister of State for Justice, and was also sworn of the Privy Council. Following the 2017 election, he was relieved of ministerial duties by Prime Minister Theresa May.

Political positions 
Penning supported Brexit before the 2016 referendum.

In May 2021, Penning tabled and was the sole signatory of an early day motion stating as the "UK has left the European Union, the UK should now leave the Eurovision Song Contest, calling on the BBC to no longer spend licence fee money on an event designed to humiliate the UK and notes that, if the winning song is to be broadcast on the public airwaves, it should be preceded by a public health warning."

Penning resigned as vice chairman of the Conservative Party in order to publicly support Penny Mordaunt's campaign in the July 2022 Conservative Party leadership election.

Personal life
Penning lives in Hemel Hempstead with his wife Angela. He employs his wife as his Office Manager on an annual salary up to £40,000. He has two daughters.

Honours
  General Service Medal with ‘NORTHERN IRELAND’ Clasp
  Privy Counsellor (2014)
  Knight Bachelor (2017)

References

External links

 
 Conservative Party – Mike Penning biography
 
 Guardian Unlimited Politics – Ask Aristotle: Mike Penning MP
 Debrett's People of Today

|-

|-

|-

|-

|-

|-

1957 births
Military personnel from London
Grenadier Guards soldiers
Alumni of the University of Reading
Conservative Party (UK) MPs for English constituencies
Government ministers of the United Kingdom
Hemel Hempstead
Knights Bachelor
Living people
Members of the Privy Council of the United Kingdom
People from Hemel Hempstead
People from Rochford
People from South Benfleet
Politicians awarded knighthoods
Politics of Dacorum
UK MPs 2005–2010
UK MPs 2010–2015
UK MPs 2015–2017
UK MPs 2017–2019
Northern Ireland Office junior ministers
UK MPs 2019–present